James C. Fritzen (1889-1945) was a member of the Wisconsin State Assembly.

Biography
Fritzen was born on April 14, 1889, in Neenah, Wisconsin. He worked in the grocery retail business. During World War I, he served in the United States Army. He died on October 11, 1945.

Political career
Fritzen was a member of the Assembly from 1939 until his death. Previously, he was a member of the Winnebago County, Wisconsin Board from 1922 to 1927 and Postmaster of Neenah from 1927 to 1935. He was a Republican.

References

Politicians from Neenah, Wisconsin
Businesspeople from Wisconsin
County supervisors in Wisconsin
Republican Party members of the Wisconsin State Assembly
Wisconsin postmasters
Military personnel from Wisconsin
United States Army soldiers
United States Army personnel of World War I
1889 births
1945 deaths
20th-century American politicians
20th-century American businesspeople